Josefa Celsa Señaris (born 2 November 1965) is a Venezuelan herpetologist. She has published information about frogs and she has identified new genera and species. Señaris is the director of the La Salle Foundation's Natural History Museum (Spanish: Museo de historia natural La Salle - MhnLS) in Caracas.

Life
Señaris was born in 1965 and she obtained a degree in biology at the Central University of Venezuela and her doctorate in 2001 at the University of Santiago de Compostela in Spain.

She is interested in the fauna of Venezuela, in particular the Guayana Region where table-top mountains called tepuis provide habitats for endemic plant and animal species: some amphibians are known only from a single tepuy. From a geological point of view, the tepuis have been isolated for approximately 120 million years, and it has been suggested that the tepuy habitats are a "lost world" that could support relictual populations. However, Señaris's work suggests that in a zoological context tepuis are not as isolated as originally believed, and that some of their species are neoendemics rather than paleoendemics. For example, an endemic group of tree frogs, Tepuihyla, have diverged after the tepuis were formed, that is, speciation followed colonization from the lowlands.

Señaris became the director in 2004 of the La Salle Foundation's Natural History Museum (Spanish: Museo de historia natural La Salle - MhnLS) in Caracas.

Señaris has erected two genera (including Tepuihyla mentioned above) and described several species new to science. In many cases Señaris collaborated with two other herpetologists, José Ayarzagüena and Stefan Gorzula.

Honours

Eponyms
In recognition of her "contributions to the knowledge of centrolenid diversity and morphology" she has had a genus of glass frog, Celsiella, named after her nickname which is Celsi.

Legacy
She has described a number of taxa, in particular amphibians but also a few reptiles.

Genera

Metaphryniscus Señaris,  & Gorzula, 1994
Tepuihyla Ayarzagüena, Señaris & Gorzula, 1993

Species

Arthrosaura testigensis Gorzula & Señaris, 1999
Celsiella vozmedianoi Ayarzagüena & Señaris, 1997
Cercosaura nigroventris Gorzula & Señaris, 1999
Hyalinobatrachium guairarepanense Señaris, 2001
Hyalinobatrachium mondolfii Señaris & Ayarzagüena, 2001
Hypsiboas jimenezi Señaris & Ayarzagüena, 2006
Hypsiboas rhythmicus Señaris & Ayarzagüena, 2002
Metaphryniscus sosai Señaris, Ayarzagüena & Gorzula, 1994
Myersiohyla aromatica Ayarzagüena & Señaris, 1994
Myersiohyla inparquesi Ayarzagüena & Señaris, 1994
Oreophrynella cryptica Señaris, 1995

Oreophrynella nigra Señaris, Ayarzagüena & Gorzula, 1994
Oreophrynella vasquezi Señaris, Ayarzagüena & Gorzula, 1994
Oreophrynella weiassipuensis Señaris, Nascimento & Villarreal, 2005
Riolama uzzelli Molina & Señaris, 2003
Stefania oculosa Señaris, Ayarzagüena & Gorzula, 1997
Stefania percristata Señaris, Ayarzagüena & Gorzula, 1997
Stefania riveroi Señaris, Ayarzagüena & Gorzula, 1997
Stefania satelles Señaris, Ayarzagüena & Gorzula, 1997
Stefania schuberti Señaris, Ayarzagüena & Gorzula, 1997
Tepuihyla aecii Ayarzagüena, Señaris & Gorzula, 1993
Tepuihyla edelcae Ayarzagüena, Señaris & Gorzula, 1993
Tepuihyla galani Ayarzagüena, Señaris & Gorzula, 1993
Tepuihyla luteolabris Ayarzagüena, Señaris & Gorzula, 1993
Tepuihyla rimarum Ayarzagüena, Señaris & Gorzula, 1993
Vitreorana castroviejoi Ayarzagüena & Señaris, 1997

References

External links

1965 births
Living people
Central University of Venezuela alumni
Venezuelan herpetologists
Women herpetologists
21st-century zoologists
21st-century Venezuelan women scientists
21st-century Venezuelan scientists
People from Caracas